Killing is a surname. Notable people with the surname include:

Alison Killing, British architect and urban designer
Laure Killing (1959–2019), French actress
Wesley Killing (born 1993), Canadian pair skater
Wilhelm Killing (1847–1923), German mathematician

See also
Killings (surname)